Thomas Papadopoulos (born 24 March 1996) is a Greek professional footballer who plays as a winger.

References

1996 births
Living people
Greek footballers
Football League (Greece) players
Super League Greece 2 players
Aiginiakos F.C. players
Platanias F.C. players
Association football wingers
Footballers from Veria